The Community Associations Institute (CAI) is an international trade association and special interest group headquartered in Falls Church, Virginia, with more than 60 chapters in the United States that asserts that it provides "education and resources to the volunteer homeowners who govern community associations", and provides petitions for legislative and regulatory beneficence for its members.

Since CAI was founded in 1973, the organization has sought to be the people that build and service common interest developments (CIDs), in order to become a significant force in interest group politics in many states. According to Evan McKenzie, they are dominated by lawyers and property managers that have shaped legislative and judicial policy making to prevent meaningful regulation of CID activity, and to keep the discourse on such matters largely private.

In the absence of legislative regulation or oversight perceived as meaningful to their objectives, the idea of residential private government took the shape advocated originally by developers through the Urban Land Institute and the Federal Housing Administration, and later, by lawyers and property managers, through CAI.

Over the decades, CAI has worked to address concerns raised about the development industry by critics, such as, about professor McKenzie. Board and manager training classes and national certifications for core competency have been developed. Led initially by community managers Bill Overton and Rob Felix, over the last 20 years in particular, the Institute has shifted its primary focus from tasks related to asset management to creating a process that "Builds Community" and delivers positive customer service. McKenzie has been invited to participate in dialogue on this philosophy shift on more than one occasion.

See also
Homeowner association
Association law
Community association 
Condominium
List of condominiums in the United States

References 

Trade associations based in the United States
Real estate industry trade groups
Organizations established in 1973
Organizations based in Virginia
Condominium organizations
Real estate-related professional associations